Not to be mistaken for footballer Roque Santa Cruz.

Roque González de Santa Cruz (17 November 1576 – 15 November 1628) was a Jesuit priest who was the first missionary among the Guarani people in Paraguay. He is honored as a martyr and saint by the Catholic Church.

Life
González was born in the city of Asunción, now part of Paraguay, on 17 November 1576. He was the son of the Spanish colonists Bartolomé González y de Villaverde and María de Santa Cruz, who were both from noble families. Due to the large native population in the region, he spoke Guaraní fluently from an early age, as well as his native Spanish.

In 1598, at the age of 23, González was ordained a priest by Fernando Trexo y Senabria, the Bishop of Córdoba, to serve that diocese. In 1609 he became a member of the Society of Jesus, beginning his work as a missionary in what is now Brazil. He became the first European person to enter the region known today as the State of Rio Grande do Sul, extending the system of Jesuit reductions begun in Paraguay to that region.

González' arrival in the area happened only after his developing delicate relationships of trust with local indigenous leaders, some of whom feared that the priests were preparing the way for the arrival of masses of Spanish colonists in their land.

In 1613 González led the founding of the Reduction of San Ignacio Miní. In 1615 he founded Itapúa, which is now the City of Posadas in the Argentine Province of Misiones. Then he had to move the reduction to the other side of the river, now the site of the City of Encarnación. He also founded the reductions of Concepción de la Sierra Candelaria (1619), Candelaria (1627), San Javier, Yapeyú (now in the Province of Corrientes), San Nicolás, Asunción del Ijuí, and Caaró (now in Brazil). In the region of Iyuí, he had difficulties with the local chieftain and sorcerer (cacique) Nheçu (written Ñezú in Spanish), who opposed the missions.

On 15 November 1628, while preparing to oversee the installation of a new bell for the church at the Mission of Todos los Santos de Caaró, González was struck down and killed with a tomahawk, along with his fellow Jesuit, Juan del Castillo, upon the orders of Nheçu. After their deaths, their bodies were dragged into the church, which was set ablaze. Two days later, their colleague Alonso Rodríguez y Olmedo was also murdered by followers of Nheçu.

Veneration  
González was beatified by Pope Pius XI on 28 January 1934. He and his companions were later canonized by Pope John Paul II in Asunción, thus becoming the first native of Paraguay to be declared a saint by the Catholic Church.

González has been named the patron saint of the cities of Posadas, Argentina, and Encarnación, Paraguay. Liturgically he is commemorated on 16 November, along with the other "Martyrs of the Rio de la Plata".

References

Bibliography 
Ghezzi, Bert. "St. Roque González, SJ (1576-1628)", Voices of the Saints, 
Clement J. McNaspy, S.J.: Conquistador without Sword. The Life of Roque González, S.J., Chicago, Loyola University Press, 1984, 206pp.

 'Os Olhos do Pe. Roque' or 'Father Roque's Eyes' 

Jesuit saints
1576 births
1628 deaths
People from Asunción
Viceroyalty of Peru people
16th-century Spanish Jesuits
Paraguayan Jesuits
Jesuit martyrs
Spanish Roman Catholic missionaries
Brazilian Roman Catholic saints
Spanish Roman Catholic saints
Paraguayan Roman Catholic saints
17th-century Roman Catholic martyrs
Beatifications by Pope Pius XI
16th-century Christian saints
17th-century Christian saints
Canonizations by Pope John Paul II
Christians in Paraguay